The 13th Pan American Games were held in Winnipeg, Manitoba, Canada from July 23 to August 8, 1999.

Medals

Gold

Women's 100 metres: Chandra Sturrup
Women's 200 metres: Debbie Ferguson

Bronze

Women's Javelin: Laverne Eve

Results by event

See also
Bahamas at the 2000 Summer Olympics

Nations at the 1999 Pan American Games
1999
Pan American Games